André Kouprianoff (born 19 October 1938) is a retired French speed skater who won three all-round medals at the European and world championships in 1960–1962. He competed at the 1960 and 1964 Winter Olympics in 500 m to 10,000 m distances with the best achievement of eighth place in 1,500 m in 1960.

Personal bests: 
500 m – 41.5 (1960)
1500 m – 2:11.4 (1964)
5000 m – 8:03.9 (1962)
10000 m – 16:39.1 (1960)

References

1938 births
Living people
Olympic speed skaters of France
Speed skaters at the 1960 Winter Olympics
Speed skaters at the 1964 Winter Olympics
French male speed skaters
Sportspeople from Paris
World Allround Speed Skating Championships medalists